Martin Ridge is a broad ice-covered ridge bordering the west side of upper Moody Glacier in the Queen Alexandra Range, Antarctica. It was named by the Advisory Committee on Antarctic Names for Major Wilbur E. Martin, U.S.Army, who was in charge of trail operations during U.S. Navy Operation Deep Freeze, 1963.

References

Ridges of the Ross Dependency
Shackleton Coast